Cirripectes variolosus, the red-speckled blenny, is a species of combtooth blenny found in coral reefs in the Pacific ocean.  This species reaches a length of  TL.

References

External links
 

variolosus
Fish described in 1836